Derby is a small Australian town located in the northeast of Tasmania.

History
The greater Derby area was inhabited by the indigenous North East nation for over 10,000 years prior to the British colonisation of Tasmania. 

The area was surveyed in 1855, but was not settled until 1874, when George Renison Bell discovered tin in the area. The Krushka brothers discovered a large lode of tin, and set up a mine (named The Brothers Mine) in the area, assuring the town's economic future. The town was originally known as Brother's Home until renamed Derby (believed to be after Edward Smith-Stanley, 14th Earl of Derby the Prime Minister of the United Kingdom).

Brother's Home Post Office opened on 1 August 1882 and was renamed Derby in 1885.

Derby reached its peak in the late 19th century, when its population reached over 3,000, and the Brothers Mine (renamed the Briseis Mine after the winner of the 1876 Melbourne Cup) was producing upwards of 120 tonnes of tin per month.

On 4 April 1929, the Briseis Dam used by the mine burst after heavy rains and the Cascade River flooded the town, killing 14 people. The mine was closed, but re-opened five years later although it never reached the same level of output as it had in the last century and closed in 1948.

Derby was served by a branch railway line which extended from Launceston to Herrick, 4 kilometres (2.4 mi) short of Moorina. The line through Derby station opened on 15 March 1919 and ran through the hills 2 km (1.2 mi) from the town. The railway closed in April 1992.

Mountain biking in Derby

In 2015 the Tasmanian Government called for tourism developments in national parks and as a result approved a mountain bike tourism experience called the Blue Derby Pods Ride. In 2015 a network of Mountain Bike trails opened in the wooded hills surrounding Derby. The  of trails are called Blue Derby. The Derby trail network has been commended around the world as one of the best. In April 2017, Derby hosted a round of the Enduro World Series. It was the first time the Enduro World Series has been held in Australia. In March 2019, Derby hosted round two of the Enduro World Series. The changes to the town have also caused friction between tourists and some locals. After the success of mountain biking in Derby, several mountain bike trails opened on Mount Heemskirk on the West Coast in 2020.

Festivals
Until it was discontinued in 2018 due to a lack of volunteers, Derby hosted the Derby River Derby in October—an annual friendly river race featuring homemade or inflatable rafts. In 2008, the race had an attendance of approximately 4,000 people and attracted up to 1,000 competitors from around the state.

References

External links
Derby Online Access Centre

Towns in Tasmania
Mining towns in Tasmania
North East Tasmania
Localities of Dorset Council (Australia)